Emily Hollinshead (born 13 September 1995) is a Welsh footballer who plays as a winger and striker for Fylde and the Wales national team.

Early life 
Hollinshead was born in Crewe, England. When she was 11, Hollinshead challenged a ban from The Football Association on girls over 11 not being allowed to play in the same football team as boys. After her father threatened legal action against The FA for sex discrimination, they announced that they were either considering changing the age limit to under-14 level or allow a special dispensation for one year to allow girls to play in boys teams. During this time, she was a part of the Crewe Alexandra F.C. Girls Centre of Excellence. She later went on to study Primary Education at Manchester Metropolitan University with a view to become a teacher.

Playing career

Club
Hollinshead started her senior career at Manchester United Ladies where she won the North West League.

Everton
In 2014, she moved to Women's Super League team Everton Ladies while also studying at Manchester Metropolitan University and playing for them in the Northern 1A British Universities and Colleges Sport League. She made her debut for Everton against Durham Women's F.C. in 2014.

Sheffield United
After the FA WSL Spring Series, Hollinshead made the move to Sheffield United.

Fylde
Hollinshead moved to Fylde in February 2018.

International
Hollinshead was called up to represent the Wales women's national football team by Jayne Ludlow for their UEFA Women's Euro 2017 qualifying matches. Hollinshead made her debut for Wales against the Bosnia and Herzegovina women's national football team.

References

External links 

 Everton player profile

Welsh women's footballers
People from Nantwich
Everton F.C. (women) players
Sheffield United W.F.C. players
Alumni of Manchester Metropolitan University
1995 births
Living people
Wales women's international footballers
Women's association football forwards
Fylde Ladies F.C. players